Angelo und Luzy (German: Angelo and Luzy) was a German comedy television series broadcast on ZDF in six episodes in 1984. It starred Iris Berben (Luzy) and Rolf Zacher (Angelo) in the lead roles.

See also
List of German television series

External links
 

German comedy television series
1984 German television series debuts
1984 German television series endings
ZDF original programming
German-language television shows